James Edward Gordon (UK, 1913–1998) was one of the founders of materials science and biomechanics, and a well-known author of three books on structures and materials, which have been translated in many languages and are still widely used in schools and universities.

Biography

Gordon graduated in naval architecture at Glasgow University. During World War II he worked at the Royal Aircraft Establishment (RAE); here he studied composite materials, wooden aircraft, plastics and new materials of many types. He designed the rescue dinghies for most bomber aircraft used in the war, and studied the strength and behaviour of reinforcement fibres made of glass, carbon, boron and other materials.

After the war he worked at Tube Investments (TI) at the Group Research Laboratory, Hinxton Hall, near Cambridge.

From 1962 he was head of a new branch at the Explosives Research and Development Establishment (ERDE), Waltham Abbey dealing with completely new structural materials. Some of his discoveries are still applied in the construction of fibre-reinforced parts for aircraft and rockets.

Titles and awards

Industrial Fellow Commoner at Churchill College, Cambridge.
Professor of Materials Technology at the University of Reading.
British Silver Medal of the Royal Aeronautical Society
Griffith Medal of the Materials Science Club

Works
The New Science of Strong Materials or Why You Don't Fall Through the Floor - Pelican Books, 1968 - 
Structures: Or Why Things Don't Fall Down - Pelican Books, 1978 - 
The Science of Structures and Materials - Scientific American Library, 1988 -

References
 J.E.Gordon's profile on Penguin site.
 Jeronimedis & Gordon's work with wood toughness
 Introduction, by Philip Ball, from J.E. Gordon's "The New Science of Strong Materials"
 Article - Nature as an Engineer" New Scientist 17 Feb 1972 on Googlebooks

British materials scientists
1998 deaths
1913 births
Alumni of the University of Glasgow